Napo County is a county in the west of Guangxi, China, bordering Yunnan province to the north and northwest as well as Vietnam's Cao Bằng and Hà Giang provinces to the south and west, respectively. It is under the administration of Baise city.

Demographics
Ethnic groups in Napo County include the following (Napo County Gazetteer).

Han Chinese
Zhuang people
Buyang people
Miao people
White Miao 白苗
Yao people
Landian Yao 蓝靛瑶; autonyms: Xiumen 秀门, Jinmen 金门
Daban Yao 大板瑶; autonym: Mian 勉
Yi people
White Yi 白彝
Red Yi 红彝

Zhuang
The "Buzhuang" 布壮 (including the Black-Clothed Zhuang 黑衣壮, or Min 敏) are located in Chengxiang 城厢, Pohe 坡荷, Longhe 龙合, Delong 德隆, Baidu 百都, Bainan 百南, Baihe 百合, Pingmeng 平孟, Baisheng 百省等乡; 461 villages.

Buyang 布央
Budong 布峒
Bunong 布农
Buyi 布依
Burui 布锐
Bu'ao 布嗷
Busheng 布省
Bujue 布决
Buyong 布拥

Yi
In Napo County, ethnic Yi are located in the following villages.
Chengxiang Township 城厢镇 (the county seat)
Dala 达腊
Zhexiang 者祥
Nianbi 念毕
Powu, Baisheng Township 百省乡坡五彝寨

The Napo County Gazetteer (那坡县志) reports two subgroups of ethnic Yi, with respective names and geographic distributions.
White Yi 白彝 (White Lolo 白倮倮); also called Gaokujiao Yi 高裤脚彝, Qunku Yi 裙裤彝; autonym: Mangzuo 芒佐. Located in the following villages:
Dala 达腊 of Dala Village 达腊村, Chengxiang Township 城厢镇
Nianbi 念毕 of Dala Village 达腊村, Chengxiang Township 城厢镇
Zhexiang 者祥 of Nianjia Village 念甲村, Chengxiang Township 城厢镇
Yanhua 岩华 of Nianjia Village 念甲村, Chengxiang Township 城厢镇
Pobao 坡报 of Bajiaoping Village 芭蕉坪村, Nalong Township 那隆乡
Dawang 达汪 of Gemen Village 各门村, Nalong Township 那隆乡
Xiameyao 下么要/爱 of Bajiaoping Village 芭蕉坪村, Nalong Township 那隆乡
Red Yi 红彝 (Red Lolo 红倮倮); also called Red-Head Yi 红头彝, Huayao Yi 花腰彝; autonyms: Mangji 芒集, Mieji 乜集
Xiahua Township 下华乡 area
Powu 坡五/伍 of Mianliang Village 面良村, Baisheng Township 百省乡
Pokang 坡康屯 of Mianliang Village 面良村, Baisheng Township 百省乡

Climate

References

Counties of Guangxi
Counties and cities in Baise